A Guy and a Gal (Swedish: En kille och en tjej) is a 1975 Swedish comedy film directed by Lasse Hallström, in his feature film directorial debut. It was the most popular film in Sweden in 1975 with receipts of 9,439,000 Swedish krona in the first six months of release.

Plot

Cast
Brasse Brännström - Lasse
Mariann Rudberg - Lena
Christer Jonsson - Bosse
Börje Ahlstedt - Lasse's brother
Roland Hedlund - Lena's stepfather
Chatarina Larsson - Berit
Anna Godenius - Lasse's ex
Gun Jönsson - Lena's mother
Claire Wikholm - Berit
Janne Forsell - Guy at discothèque
Magnus Härenstam - Party guest
Else-Marie Brandt - Lasse's mother
Lena T. Hansson - Wallflower
Eddie Axberg - Patient at the clinic
Tomas Bolme -  Guest at the party watching television

References

External links
 
 

1975 comedy films
1975 films
Films directed by Lasse Hallström
Swedish comedy films
1970s Swedish-language films
1975 directorial debut films
1970s Swedish films